Thomas St Lawrence, 3rd Earl of Howth KP (16 August 1803 – 4 February 1874) was an Irish peer, styled Viscount St Lawrence until 1822.

He became Earl of Howth in 1822 on the death of his father, William St Lawrence, 2nd Earl of Howth. His mother was William's second wife Margaret Burke. He was Vice-Admiral of the Coast of Leinster, and was appointed a Knight of the Order of St Patrick on 22 July 1835 and Lord Lieutenant of County Dublin in 1851.

On 9 January 1826, he married Lady Emily, daughter of John de Burgh, 13th Earl of Clanricarde and Elizabeth Burke. She died of measles in 1842 in Dublin. On 27 February 1851, he married Henrietta Elizabeth Digby Barfoot (d. 5 March 1884) of Midlington House, Hampshire, daughter of Peter Barfoot and Henrietta Digby. When he died in the south of France in 1874, he was succeeded by his son by his first marriage, William.

Family

With Lady Emily de Burgh
 Lady Emily St. Lawrence
 Lady Catherine Elizabeth St. Lawrence
 Lady Mary St. Lawrence
 Lady Margaret Frances St. Lawrence
 William Ulick Tristram St. Lawrence, 4th Earl of Howth

With Henriette Elizabeth Digby Barfoot
 Lady Geraldine Digby St. Lawrence
 Lady Henrietta Eliza St. Lawrence
 Captain Hon. Thomas Kenelm Digby St. Lawrence

References

1803 births
1874 deaths
Knights of St Patrick
Lord-Lieutenants of Dublin
Earls of Howth